Love Songs was a compilation album of ballads by Cliff Richard released by EMI in 1981. The album spent five weeks at the top of the UK album charts in 1981 and two weeks at the top of the Australian album charts in 1982.

The compilation spans a 20-year period, from "Theme for a Dream" (1960) through to "A Little in Love" (1980).

Track listing
"Miss You Nights"
"Constantly"
"Up in the World"
"Carrie"
"A Voice in the Wilderness"
"The Twelfth of Never"
"I Could Easily Fall (In Love with You)"
"The Day I Met Marie"
"Can't Take the Hurt Anymore"
"A Little in Love"
"The Minute You're Gone"
"Visions"
"When Two Worlds Drift Apart"
"The Next Time"
"It's All in the Game"
"Don't Talk to Him"
"When the Girl in Your Arms Is the Girl in Your Heart"
"Theme for a Dream"
"Fall in Love with You"
"We Don't Talk Anymore"

Charts

Charts

Year-end charts

Certifications

Note: Although the New Zealand reference only shows the certification of Love Songs to be Gold, it was later certified Platinum.

References

Cliff Richard compilation albums
1981 compilation albums
EMI Records compilation albums